Dong Jie (born 19 April 1980) is a Chinese actress and dancer.

Dong made her debut in Zhang Yimou's Happy Times (2000) (Yimou girl), playing a blind girl mistreated by her stepmother. Zhang selected Dong after a casting call on the Internet. Since then, she has starred in films and television series such as Sky Lovers (2002), Endless Love (2004), 2046 (2004) and  Dragon Tiger Gate (2006). Her best known role to date is "Leng Qingqiu" in Li Dawei's The Story of a Noble Family (2003), adapted from a novel by Zhang Henshui.

Personal life
In 2008, Dong married actor Pan Yueming and gave birth to a son a year later, but they divorced in 2012 after Dong accused Pan of being a gambler.

Filmography

Film

Television series

Awards and nominations

References

External links

1980 births
Living people
21st-century Chinese actresses
Actresses from Liaoning
Actresses from Dalian
People's Liberation Army Arts College alumni
Chinese film actresses
Chinese television actresses